David Goffin was the defending champion but chose not to participate this year.

Jo-Wilfried Tsonga won the title, defeating Gilles Simon in the final, 7–6(7–5), 1–6, 6–2.

Seeds
The top four seeds receive a bye into the second round.

Draw

Finals

Top half

Bottom half

Qualifying

Seeds

Qualifiers

Qualifying draw

First qualifier

Second qualifier

Third qualifier

Fourth qualifier

References
 Main draw
 Qualifying draw

Singles